Joseph Charles John Piscopo (born June 17, 1951) is an American actor, comedian and conservative radio talk show host. He was a cast member on Saturday Night Live from 1980 to 1984, where he played a variety of recurring characters. His film roles include Danny Vermin in Johnny Dangerously (1984), Moe Dickstein in Wise Guys (1986), Doug Bigelow in Dead Heat (1988), and Kelly Stone in Sidekicks (1992).

Early life 
Piscopo was born in Passaic, New Jersey, and grew up in North Caldwell. He attended West Essex High School and was a member of the drama club "The Masquers." He developed a reputation for never playing a part the way it was written. After graduating in 1969, Piscopo attended Jones College in Jacksonville, Florida, where he received a degree in broadcast management.

Saturday Night Live 
In the summer of 1980, Piscopo was hired as a contract player for Saturday Night Live. The show had gone through a major upheaval when all the writers, major producers, and cast members left that spring. The new cast bombed with critics and fans with the exception of Piscopo and Eddie Murphy. As a result, they were the only two cast members to be kept when Dick Ebersol took over the show the following spring. With the success of SNL, Piscopo moved to the wealthy borough of Alpine, New Jersey.

Piscopo was best known for his impressions of celebrities, including Frank Sinatra. Piscopo rewrote the lyrics for a Sinatra sketch with the help of Sinatra lyricist Sammy Cahn and recalled that, "by the grace of God, the old man loved it." Piscopo had an occasional spot on the Weekend Update segment as a bombastic sports commentator who would pose a series of questions and usually follow them up with a loud, “Who cares?”. Piscopo and Robin Duke also played The Whiners.

Post–Saturday Night Live career 
Piscopo left Saturday Night Live at the end of the 1983–1984 season. In 1984, he starred with Michael Keaton in the movie Johnny Dangerously, which was met with mixed reviews. He also starred in an HBO special and wrote a book for Pocket Books titled The Piscopo Tapes. An album, New Jersey, for Columbia Records, followed in 1985 and an ABC special titled The Joe Piscopo New Jersey Special in May 1986. In 1987, Piscopo was mentioned in Tom Petty and the Heartbreakers' No. 1 rock single "Jammin' Me".

In the mid-to-late 1980s, Piscopo developed an interest in bodybuilding. He first became involved with it when he was doing impressions of Bruce Springsteen on SNL. He appeared on the cover of Muscle & Fitness magazine in April 1988 and again in June 1990. In the 1990 issue, he said, "Some people in Hollywood think I'm nuts with this bodybuilding stuff. They'll say, 'You're getting too big. You'll hurt your career.' But they don't understand that high that comes from a workout, the challenge, and the personal victory."

Since January 2014, Piscopo has hosted Piscopo in the Morning, a radio show from 6:00 am to 10:00am weekdays on 970AM The Answer in New York City. From the inception of his radio program until June 2020, Piscopo's program was produced by Frank Morano, who also served as an on-air contributor. Starting on December 13, 2020, Piscopo also began to host the Ramsey Mazda Sunday Nights with Sinatra on 770 AM WABC in New York and WABC's sister station 107.1 FM WLIR in Hampton Bays.

Piscopo considered running as an independent for governor of New Jersey in 2017 based in part on the political success of Donald Trump, for whom he campaigned in 2016. He was encouraged by a number of political figures, including former New York City mayor Rudy Giuliani. However, in May 2017, he ultimately decided not to run. Piscopo has been active in a band and performed stand up and music at a political rally hosted by businessman Mike Lindell in May 2021.

Personal life
Piscopo was diagnosed with thyroid cancer in 1990. In 1973, Piscopo married Nancy Jones. They had one child and divorced in 1988. In 1997, he married Kimberly Driscoll, who was his son's nanny when Piscopo was married to Jones. They had three children and divorced in 2006. 

Piscopo is a resident of Lebanon Township, New Jersey, and has also lived in Tewksbury Township, New Jersey. 

Piscopo is an avid New Jersey Devils fan and was the emcee for the team's 2003 Stanley Cup championship celebration.

Awards
In 2013, Piscopo was inducted into the New Jersey Hall of Fame.

Filmography

References

External links 
 
 
 

1951 births
Living people
20th-century American comedians
21st-century American comedians
American impressionists (entertainers)
American male film actors
American male musical theatre actors
American male television actors
American male voice actors
American people of Italian descent
American sketch comedians
People from Alpine, New Jersey
People from Lebanon Township, New Jersey
People from North Caldwell, New Jersey
People from Passaic, New Jersey
People from Tewksbury Township, New Jersey
West Essex High School alumni